Ogbourne may refer to:

Places
Ogbourne Maizey
Ogbourne St Andrew
Ogbourne St George

People
Lyndon Ogbourne (born 1983), English actor

Other
Ogbourne railway station, railway station in Wiltshire